Shawnee is a tribe of Native Americans.

Shawnee may also refer to:

Places

United States
Shawnee, Colorado
Shawnee, Georgia
Shawnee, Kansas
Shawnee County, Kansas
Shawnee Mission, Kansas
Shawnee, Louisville, Kentucky
Shawnee, Hamilton County, Ohio
Shawnee, Perry County, Ohio
Shawnee, Oklahoma
Shawnee, Wyoming
Fort Shawnee, Ohio
Shawnee Falls, one of 24 named waterfalls in Ricketts Glen State Park in Pennsylvania
Shawnee Field, an airport in Bloomfield, Indiana
Shawnee Hills, a region of southern Illinois and western Kentucky
Shawnee Hills AVA, wine region within the larger Shawnee Hills
Shawnee Hills, Delaware County, Ohio
Shawnee Hills, Greene County, Ohio
Shawnee National Forest in Illinois
Shawnee on Delaware, Pennsylvania

Elsewhere
Shawnee Slopes, Calgary, a neighbourhood of Calgary, Alberta, Canada

Ski resorts
 Shawnee Mountain Ski Area, in Stroudsburg, Pennsylvania
 Shawnee Peak Ski Area, in Bridgton, Maine

Transportation
Shawnee (Amtrak train), an Amtrak train
Shawnee  (IC train), an Illinois Central train
Piasecki H-21/CH-21 Shawnee helicopter
SS Shawnee, a 1927 passenger steam ship

Other uses
Shawnee Indians (baseball), minor league baseball team
Shawnee language
Shawnee Lodge, a Boy Scout lodge in the Greater St. Louis Area Council area
Shawnee Smith (born 1969), female actress

See also
Shawnee Trail (disambiguation)